Lisy may refer to:
Lisii Island in the Russian Far East
Lisy, Lublin Voivodeship (east Poland)
Lisy, Podlaskie Voivodeship (north-east Poland)
Lisy, Gołdap County in Warmian-Masurian Voivodeship (north Poland)
Lisy, Pisz County in Warmian-Masurian Voivodeship (north Poland)
Lizy (actress), a popular actress in Indian cinema